Christian allegory may refer to:
Allegory in the Middle Ages
Allegory in Christian literature
Christian mythology

See also
Allegory
Biblical literalism